As-Sayl Al-Kabīr is a village in Makkah Region, western Saudi Arabia, which is located some distance from the city of Taif. Abdullah ibn Abbas narrated that his cousin, the Islamic Prophet Muhammad, had fixed Qarn al-Manāzil as the miqat for the people of Najd. It has also been used as a miqat by people coming from places like Oman, the U.A.E., Pakistan, Malaysia and Australia.

Gallery

See also 
 List of cities and towns in Saudi Arabia
 As-Sayl As-Saghir
 Regions of Saudi Arabia
 Sarat Mountains
 Hijaz Mountains
 Taif International Airport

References

External links 

At-Ta'if
Populated places in Mecca Province